Andrei Yuryevich Kondrashov (born 7 August 1972) is an association football coach and a former player.

Honours
 Russian Cup winner: 1999.
 Russian Second Division Zone West best defender: 2004, 2005.

International career
Kondrashov played his only game for Russia on 18 November 1998 in a friendly against Brazil.

External links 
  Profile

1972 births
Living people
Russian footballers
Russia international footballers
FC Dynamo Saint Petersburg players
FC Zenit Saint Petersburg players
Russian Premier League players
FC Elista players
FC Luch Vladivostok players
FC Baltika Kaliningrad players
Footballers from Saint Petersburg
FC Khimki players
Russian football managers
Association football defenders
FC Petrotrest players
FC Lokomotiv Saint Petersburg players